Valle Crucis Historic District is a national historic district located at Valle Crucis, Watauga County, North Carolina.  The district encompasses 50 contributing buildings, 1 contributing site, and 7 contributing structures in the central business district and surrounding residential sections of Valle Crucis.  It developed between about 1812 and 1954, and includes notable examples of Gothic Revival, Bungalow / American Craftsman, and Colonial Revival style architecture.  Located in the district are the separately listed Mast General Store, Mast Farm, and Valle Crucis Episcopal Mission.  Other notable contributing buildings are the Baird Farm (c. 1860, c. 1872), Lucy Mast Olsen House (1936-1940), Taylor tobacco barn, Farthing Store (1909), Valle Crucis Bank (1914), Hard Taylor House (c. 1855, 1895), and C. D. "Squire" Taylor House (1911).

It was listed on the National Register of Historic Places in 2005.

Gallery

References

Historic districts on the National Register of Historic Places in North Carolina
Gothic Revival architecture in North Carolina
Colonial Revival architecture in North Carolina
Buildings and structures in Watauga County, North Carolina
National Register of Historic Places in Watauga County, North Carolina